The 1980 Glasgow Central by-election was a by-election held on 26 June 1980 for the British House of Commons constituency of Glasgow Central, following the death of its sitting MP, Thomas McMillan.

On a turnout of 48%, the Labour Party held the seat.

Background

Labour had held the seat for 30 years, having won it at the 1950 general election. McMillan had been the MP for the seat since 1966.

Candidates
This was the last parliamentary by-election in England, Scotland or Wales not contested by an official candidate of either the Liberal Party, the SDP, or their successor party the Liberal Democrats; until the 2008 Haltemprice and Howden by-election. The Social Democrat candidate had no connection to the SDP (which wasn't created until 1981) and achieved the lowest vote for any candidate in a Parliamentary election under universal suffrage, a record later surpassed by the five votes obtained by independent campaigner Bill Boaks in the Glasgow Hillhead by-election of March 1982.

Because there was no official candidate, Liberal Party member Graham Watson offered himself as a candidate sponsored by the Scottish Young Liberals. He later became a Member of the European Parliament and leader of the Alliance of Liberals and Democrats for Europe group in the European Parliament.

As a seat considered safe for Labour, there was little surprise when its candidate Bob McTaggart was declared victor, with 60.8% of the votes cast. Both of his closest rivals were later elected to sit in British parliaments: Gil Paterson, representing the Scottish National Party, was elected as a delegate for Central Scotland in the first sitting of the Scottish Parliament in 1999, while Conservative Anna McCurley won the Renfrew West and Inverclyde seat in the general election of 1983. McCurley was at the time a member of Strathclyde Regional Council, to which she had been elected in 1978, and had unsuccessfully contested West Stirlingshire for the Conservatives at the previous general election.

While Labour won, the good performance of the SNP was described by The Glasgow Herald as the "surprise of the night" and the newspaper argued it mark their return "to the political stage" and that "both the major parties... were shaken" by the SNP's share of the vote.

Votes

1979 general election result

See also
 Glasgow Central - the 2005 re-creation of the historic constituency
 Lists of United Kingdom by-elections
 United Kingdom by-election records
 Elections in Scotland

References

1980 in Scotland
1980s elections in Scotland
1980 elections in the United Kingdom
June 1980 events in the United Kingdom
Central
1980s in Glasgow